Paratendipes is a genus of European non-biting midges in the subfamily Chironominae of the bloodworm family Chironomidae.

Species
P. albimanus (Meigen, 1818)
P. basidens Townes, 1945
P. fuscitibia Sublette, 1960
P. nitidulus (Coquillett, 1901)
P. nubilus (Meigen, 1830)
P. nudisquama (Edwards, 1929)
P. plebeius (Meigen, 1818)
P. sinelobus Albu, 1980
P. subaequalis (Malloch, 1915)
P. thermophilus Townes, 1945

References

Chironomidae
Diptera of Europe